Jean-Pierre Huguet-Balent (born 19 March 1955) is a French rowing coxswain. He competed at the 1976, 1980, 1984 and the 1992 Summer Olympics.

References

1955 births
Living people
French male rowers
Olympic rowers of France
Rowers at the 1976 Summer Olympics
Rowers at the 1980 Summer Olympics
Rowers at the 1984 Summer Olympics
Rowers at the 1992 Summer Olympics
Sportspeople from Lot-et-Garonne
Coxswains (rowing)